Sanitarium or sanatorium may refer to:

Facilities
Sanatorium, medical facility for long-term illness, often associated with treatment of tuberculosis before antibiotics
Sanatorium (resort), facility with spa and medical services, as known in Russia, Ukraine, and other former Soviet Union republics
Battle Creek Sanitarium, American health resort founded in 1866
Sanitarium Health and Wellbeing Company, major food company in Australia and New Zealand

Film and video games
The Sanitarium (film), a 1910 American silent comedy short starring Fatty Arbuckle
Sanitarium (video game), American 1998 point-and-click adventure
Sanitarium (film), a 2013 American horror anthology film

Localities
Sanitarium, California, American unincorporated community in Napa County
Sanatorium, Mississippi, American village near Magee

Music
"Welcome Home (Sanitarium)", 1986 song by American heavy metal band Metallica
Sanatorium (band), North Macedonia thrash metal band from Skopje, formed in 1987